Clarence Oscar "Clary" Anderson (July 7, 1911 – August 19, 1988) was an American football and baseball player and coach. He was the head baseball and football coach for the Montclair State University in Upper Montclair, New Jersey. In seven seasons as head football coach, he compiled a record of 46–20–3 and won the first five conference titles in the newly-formed New Jersey State Athletic Conference, from 1969 to 1973. Prior to that, he was the very successful head coach in football for decades at Montclair High School. As the Montclair State's baseball coach, Anderson went 150–60 in six seasons. For his coaching efforts he was inducted into the Montclair State University Hall of Fame.

Head coaching record

College football

References

External links

1911 births
1988 deaths
American football ends
Colgate Raiders baseball players
Colgate Raiders football players
Fairleigh Dickinson Knights baseball coaches
Montclair State Red Hawks football coaches
Montclair State Red Hawks baseball coaches